On November 14, 1910, pilot Eugene Burton Ely took off in a Curtiss plane from the bow of  and later landed a Curtiss Model D on  on January 18, 1911. In fiscal year (FY) 1920, Congress approved a conversion of collier  into a ship designed for launching and recovering of airplanes at sea—the first aircraft carrier of the United States Navy. More aircraft carriers were approved and built, including , the first class of aircraft carriers in the United States Navy designed and built as aircraft carriers from the keel.

The United States declared war on Japan following the attack of December 7, 1941 on Pearl Harbor. The two nations revolutionized naval warfare in the course of the next four years; several of the most important sea battles were fought without either fleet coming within sight of the other. Most of the fleet carriers were built according to prewar designs, but the demand for air protection was so intense that two new classes were developed: light carriers (designated CVL), built on modified cruiser hulls, and escort carriers (CVE), whose main function was to protect Atlantic convoys from German U-boats.

During the postwar period, carrier technology made many advances. The angled flight deck was adopted in 1955. The first "supercarrier" was commissioned in 1955 (although an earlier plan had been canceled by the Secretary of Defense), and the first nuclear-powered carrier in 1961, all during the Cold War. Also, a record for crossing the Pacific Ocean was set by a U.S. Navy carrier during the Korean War. Carriers recovered spacecraft after splashdown, including the Mercury-Redstone 3 and Apollo 11 missions.

The last conventionally powered (non-nuclear) US Navy carrier was decommissioned in 2007.

Pre–World War II
On November 14, 1910, a 24‑year‑old civilian pilot, Eugene Burton Ely, took off in a 50 horsepower Curtiss plane from a wooden platform built over the bow of the cruiser ; later, on January 18, 1911, Ely landed a Curtiss Model D on a platform aboard . The Naval Appropriations Act for Fiscal Year 1920 provided funds for the conversion of  into a ship designed for the launching and recovery of airplanes at sea—the United States Navy's first aircraft carrier. Renamed , she was commissioned in 1922. Commander Kenneth Whiting was placed in command. In 1924, Langley reported for duty with the Battle Fleet, ending two years as an experimental ship.

Following Ranger and before the entry of the United States into World War II, four more carriers were commissioned. 
 was essentially an improved version of Ranger.

World War II
The Imperial Japanese Navy struck Pearl Harbor on December 7, 1941, but none of the Pacific Fleet's aircraft carriers were in the harbor. Because a large fraction of the navy's battleship fleet was put out of commission by the attack, the undamaged aircraft carriers were forced to become the load-bearers of the early part of the war. The first aircraft carrier offensive of the U.S. Navy came on February 1, 1942, when the carriers Enterprise and Yorktown, attacked the Japanese bases in the Marshall and Gilbert Islands. The Battle of the Coral Sea became the first sea battle in history in which neither opposing fleet saw the other. The Battle of Midway started as a Japanese offensive on Midway Atoll met by an outnumbered U.S. carrier force, and resulted in a U.S. victory. The Battle of Midway was the turning point in the Pacific War.

The new designations were CVB (Aircraft carrier, large) for the  carriers being built, and CVL (Aircraft carriers, small) for the  class built on light cruiser hulls. The same directive reclassified escort carriers as combatant ships, and changed their symbol from ACV to CVE. By the end of the war, the Navy had access to around 100 carriers of varying sizes.

On September 2, 1945, Japan signed the surrender agreement aboard , ending World War II.

Training ships

During World War II, the United States Navy purchased two Great Lakes side-wheel paddle steamers and converted them into freshwater aircraft carrier training ships. Both vessels were designated with the hull classification symbol IX and lacked hangar decks, elevators or armaments. The role of these ships was for the training of pilots for carrier take-offs and landings.  Together Sable and Wolverine trained 17,820 pilots in 116,000 carrier landings.

Cold War
Aircraft carrier technology underwent many changes during the Cold War. The first of the 45,000-ton carriers,  was commissioned eight days after the end of World War II, on September 10. A larger ship was planned, and in 1948, President Harry Truman approved the construction of a "supercarrier", a 65,000-ton aircraft carrier to be named ; however, the project was canceled in April 1949 by the Secretary of Defense.

The "N" suffix was added to the designation system to represent nuclear powered carriers in 1956. The last conventionally powered carrier, was commissioned in 1968 and was decommissioned in 2007.

The Korean War began June 25, 1950, and the need for planes and troops was urgent. Returning from Korea,  made a record trip across the Pacific—7 days, 10 hours, and 36 minutes. In 1952, all carriers with designations "CV" or "CVB" were reclassified as attack carriers and given the sign "CVA".

As the Mercury-Redstone 3 mission ended,  recovered Commander Alan B. Shepard, the first American in space, on May 5, 1961.  Another aircraft carrier , recovered the Apollo 11 astronauts after their splashdown. Apollo 11 was the first manned landing mission to the moon, and was composed of astronauts Neil Armstrong, Buzz Aldrin, and Michael Collins.

Construction and commissioning of the Nimitz class continued after the Cold War.

Also, in 1975, the U.S. Navy simplified the carrier designations—CV, CVA, CVAN, CVB, CVL—into CV for conventionally powered carriers and CVN for nuclear-powered carriers.

After the Cold War
Construction of the Nimitz-class continued after the Cold War, and the last Nimitz-class carrier, was commissioned in 2009.

The next class of supercarriers—the —launched the first ship in 2017. The new carriers will be stealthier, and feature A1B reactors, electromagnetic catapults, advanced arresting gear, reduced crew requirements, and a hull design based upon that of the Nimitz class. Ten carriers are planned for the Gerald R. Ford class.

Escort carriers
During World War II, the U.S. Navy built escort carriers in large numbers for patrol work, and scouting and escorting convoys. Escort carriers, based on merchant ship hulls, were smaller than aircraft carriers; escort carrier crews referred to the ships as "Jeep carriers", the press called them "baby flat tops". The escort carriers had lighter armor than aircraft carriers, were slower, had less defensive armament, and less aircraft capacity compared to aircraft carriers. This smaller variant of carriers was designated "CVE"; a common joke amongst crews was "CVE" meant "Combustible, Vulnerable and Expendable".

Early in the war, German submarines and aircraft were interfering with shipping.  The worst losses occurred far at sea—out of the reach of land-based air forces—leading the Royal Navy to experiment with catapult-launching fighter aircraft from merchant ships, a somewhat successful approach. However, the number of planes was still limited, so the United Kingdom appealed to the United States for help.

Before World War II started, the U.S. Navy had contemplated converting merchant ships to small aircraft carriers for this purpose, so the quick solution was to build escort carriers on merchant ship hulls. The first escort carrier, was converted from a freighter. A shortage of merchant ship hulls caused four escort carriers—, and —to be built on oil tanker hulls. In total, 78 escort carriers were built and launched from June 1941 to April 1945.

See also
 List of escort aircraft carriers of the Royal Navy
 List of seaplane carriers of the Royal Navy
 Aircraft carrier
 List of amphibious warfare ships
 List of aircraft carriers
 List of aircraft carriers in service
 Timeline for aircraft carrier service
 List of aircraft carriers by configuration
 List of sunken aircraft carriers
 List of aircraft carriers of the Royal Navy
 List of aircraft carriers of Russia and the Soviet Union
 List of German aircraft carriers
 List of ships of the People's Liberation Army Navy § Aircraft carriers
 List of ships of the Japanese Navy
 List of current French Navy ships
 List of active Spanish Navy ships
 List of Canadian Navy ships
 List of Italian Navy ships
 Ships of the Indian Navy
 List of aircraft carriers of the United States Navy
 List of escort aircraft carriers of the United States Navy
 List of aircraft carriers by country
 List of ships of the Second World War
 List of aircraft carriers of the Second World War

References

External links
 

United States Navy
Aircraft carrier classes
United States Navy
Aircraft carrier classes list